Hamburg-Köln-Express GmbH (HKX) was a Cologne-based open-access train operating company providing long-distance railway passenger services in Germany. It was founded in October 2009 as a joint venture by Railroad Development Corporation (RDC) Deutschland GmbH, an affiliate of USA-based Railroad Development Corp., Locomore rail GmbH & CO. KG, and British railway investor Michael Schabas.

Since 23 July 2012, HKX has operated regular services between Hamburg-Altona and Cologne. The journey takes about 4h 20min, similar to that of services operated by DB but with lower fares. On 24 March 2018, Flixmobility, the parent company of Flixbus, took over the operations of HKX, whose route was subsequently rebranded under the Flixtrain branding, complementing the former Locomore train service operated by Leo Express on behalf of Flixmobility since 2017.

Start 
Services were initially planned to start in August 2010 but this was postponed as there were unresolved pathing conflicts between Keolis and HKX in the access application process with DB infrastructure affiliate DB Netz. After Keolis withdrew its applications in April 2010, a framework contract was signed in June 2010. The framework contract expires in December 2015.

As of March 2012 the proposed service had still not had its safety case approved by the Federal Railway Authority.

HKX began selling tickets on 4 July 2012 and started operation on 23 July 2012.

Operations 

HKX operates at least one train each way each day, from Fridays to Mondays. Fares for the entire route range from €20 to €60.

The Hamburg-Köln-Express calls at most intermediate stations also served by DB long-distance trains, but leaves out Düsseldorf Airport and Bremen Hbf. HKX uses the freight line bypassing Bremen, reducing the journey time to Hamburg. Instead, an additional stop at nearby Sagehorn was planned, but this has not yet been achieved.
The trains do only stop in Hamburg, Osnabrück, Münster, Gelsenkirchen, Essen, Duisburg, Düsseldorf and Köln.  

On 14 March 2012 Veolia Verkehr, a subsidiary of Veolia-Transdev, signed an agreement to operate the services under contract to HKX. Veolia will provide drivers and locomotives. Temporarily, services were operated with former Rheingold coaches hauled by leased Siemens ES 64 U2 "Taurus" type electric locos, which were planned to be replaced by refurbished Class 4010 type trainsets formerly owned by ÖBB.

Beginning December 2015, the coaches are from Bahn Touristik Express which now also operates the trains under contract to HKX. The Locomotive is still a leased ES 64 U2 "Taurus". Between Cologne and Hamburg one train a day runs Fri–Mon with a speed of up to 160 km/h.

Company's founders 

 Deutschland GmbH (75%) is based in Berlin and is a 100% subsidiary of the Railroad Development Corporation (RDC). RDC is a Pittsburgh-based railway investment and management company founded in 1987 by Henry Posner III and Robert A. Pietrandrea which has invested in railway operations all over the world. Locomore rail GmbH & CO. KG (17.5%) is a railway traffic enterprise in Berlin with the focus on long-distance traffic. Michael Schabas (7.5%) is a railway investor in London.

Management 

Eva Kreienkamp, CEO and CFO, responsible for business development, strategy, marketing, sales and communication, finances, controlling, legal issues, purchase, human resources. Also managing director RDC Deutschland GmbH. In June 2014, she left the company.
Carsten Carstensen, COO, responsible for railway operations and service operation. Took over the CEO post after the leave of Kreienkamp. Also managing director of the railway traffic company Locomore Rail GmbH before 2012.

See also 
 Locomore

References

External links 

 

Railway companies of Germany